The 1997 season was the Hawthorn Football Club's season 73rd season in the Australian Football League and 96th overall.

Fixture

Premiership season

Ladder

References

Hawthorn Football Club seasons